The Networked Environment for Music Analysis (NEMA) is a project for music information processing. The goal is to create an open and extensible web-service based resource framework for music information processing and retrieval.
The work is performed at the International Music Information Retrieval Systems Evaluation Laboratory (IMIRSEL).

External links
 Overview

Music information retrieval
Music software